Peter Kostis (born December 23, 1947 in Sanford, Maine) is an American golf analyst and instructor.

Among his many students are Paul Casey, Chez Reavie, Bernhard Langer, Steve Elkington, Dan Marino, Maury Povich, and Mike Schmidt. He has the Peter Kostis Learning Academy at Grayhawk Golf Club in Scottsdale, Arizona. Kostis also was the instructor who coached Kevin Costner in the film Tin Cup, also appearing as himself in a speaking role.

In 1992, Kostis joined CBS Sports as an on-course reporter and golf analyst. In addition to his CBS duties, he was the lead golf analyst for the USA Network from 1989 to 2004. Kostis, alongside Gary McCord, was not brought back for the 2020 golf broadcast team for CBS.

Kostis attended The University of New Hampshire on a football scholarship.

References

American golf instructors
Golf writers and broadcasters
Golfers from Maine
People from Sanford, Maine
1946 births
Living people